Mathieu Kassovitz (born 3 August 1967) is a French actor, film director, film producer and screenwriter. He is the founder of MNP Entreprise, a film production company. He has won three César Awards: Most Promising Actor for See How They Fall (1994), and Best Film and Best Editing for La Haine (1995). He also received Best Director and Best Writing nominations.

Early life
He is the son of Peter Kassovitz, a director and writer, and Chantal Rémy, a film editor. His mother is a French Catholic, while his father is a Hungarian Jew who fled during the Hungarian Revolution of 1956. Mathieu has described himself as "not Jewish but I was brought up in a world of Jewish humor".

Career

Filmmaker
As a filmmaker, Kassovitz has made several artistic and commercial successes. He wrote and directed La Haine (Hate, 1996), a film dealing with themes around class, race, violence, and police brutality. The film won the César Award for Best Film and netted Kassovitz the Best Director prize at the 1995 Cannes Film Festival. 

He later directed Les Rivières Pourpres (2000), a police detective thriller starring Jean Reno and Vincent Cassel, another massive commercial success in France, and Gothika (2003), a fantasy thriller (considered by some to be a commercial failure, although it grossed over three times its roughly $40 million budget), with Halle Berry and Penélope Cruz. He used the money he made from  Gothika to develop a far more personal project Babylon Babies, the adaptation of one of Maurice Dantec's books. Kassovitz established the film production firm MNP Entreprise in 2000 "to develop and produce feature films by Kassovitz and to represent him as a director and actor." MNP Entreprise is responsible for the co-productions of a number of films including Avida (2006) in which Kassovitz acts and Babylon A.D. which he directed. Kassovitz purchased the film rights for the novel Johnny Mad Dog by Congolese writer Emmanuel Dongala. The film was also co-produced by MNP Entreprise, and directed by Jean-Stéphane Sauvaire. The premiere of the film was made at the 2008 Cannes Film Festival where it was screened within the Un Certain Regard section.

In 2011, he starred in and directed Rebellion, a war film based on a true story of French commandos who clashed with tribes in New Caledonia, the Melanesian territory of France. His future project science fiction film MNP is named after  Mir Space Station, whose writing in Cyrillic letters (Мир) look like the letters MNP, and also the production company.

Actor

Kassovitz is most famous outside France for his acting role as Nino Quincampoix in Jean-Pierre Jeunet's film Amélie. He also had small roles in La Haine (which he also directed), Birthday Girl, and The Fifth Element. He played leading roles in A Self-Made Hero (1996) by Jacques Audiard and in Amen. (2003) by Costa-Gavras. Kassovitz is also recognizable for playing a conflicted Belgian explosives expert in Steven Spielberg's 2005 film Munich, alongside Eric Bana and Geoffrey Rush. Kassovitz was a jury member for the 2001 Cannes Film Festival.

Since 2015, Kassovitz has been starring in the acclaimed espionage thriller series The Bureau, broadcast in France on Canal+ and made available around the world on Amazon TV. So far five seasons have been screened.

Personal life
Kassovitz is married to French actress Julie Mauduech, whom he directed and acted alongside in his 1993 film Métisse (Café au lait, English title) and who made a brief appearance in La Haine (during the scene in the Parisian art gallery).

In 2009, Kassovitz won with a Tesla Roadster (2008) the Rallye Monte Carlo des Véhicules à Énergie Alternative (starting event of the FIA Alternative Energies Cup) in the category reserved to electric vehicles.

Kassovitz is also known for his outspokenness, frequently making controversial comments on socio-political issues. Kassovitz was an ardent critic of former president Nicolas Sarkozy, whom he described in his blog as having "ideas that not only reveal his inexperience of politics and human relations, but which also illuminate the purely demagogical and egocentric aspects of a puny, would-be Napoleon." In a 2012 interview, he labeled the outgoing Sarkozy administration as "horrible".

Filmography

As filmmaker

As actor

References

External links

Official website

1967 births
Male actors from Paris
French male film actors
French film directors
French-language film directors
French people of Hungarian-Jewish descent
FIA E-Rally Regularity Cup drivers
Living people
Cannes Film Festival Award for Best Director winners
European Film Awards winners (people)
César Award winners
Most Promising Actor César Award winners
20th-century French male actors
21st-century French male actors
Best Director Lumières Award winners
French male television actors
French film producers
French male screenwriters
French screenwriters
French film editors
French male non-fiction writers